A pictogram, also called a pictogramme, pictograph, or simply picto, and in computer usage an icon, is a graphic symbol that conveys its meaning through its pictorial resemblance to a physical object. Pictographs are often used in writing and graphic systems in which the characters are to a considerable extent pictorial in appearance.  A pictogram may also be used in subjects such as leisure, tourism, and geography.

Pictography is a form of writing which uses representational, pictorial drawings, similarly to cuneiform and, to some extent, hieroglyphic writing, which also uses drawings as phonetic letters or determinative rhymes. Some pictograms, such as Hazards pictograms, are elements of formal languages.

"Pictograph" has a different definition in the field of prehistoric art (which includes recent art by traditional societies), where it means art painted on rock surfaces. This is in comparison to petroglyphs, where the images are carved or incised. Such images may or may not be considered pictograms in the general sense.

Historical

Early written symbols were based on pictographs (pictures which resemble what they signify) and ideograms (symbols which represent ideas). Ancient Sumerian, Egyptian, and Chinese civilizations began to adapt such symbols to represent concepts, developing them into logographic writing systems. Pictographs are still in use as the main medium of written communication in some non-literate cultures in Africa, the Americas, and Oceania. Pictographs are often used as simple, pictorial, representational symbols by most contemporary cultures.

Pictographs can be considered an art form, or can be considered a written language and are designated as such in Pre-Columbian art, Native American art, Ancient Mesopotamia and Painting in the Americas before Colonization. One example of many is the Rock art of the Chumash people, part of the Native American history of California.
In 2011, UNESCO's World Heritage List added "Petroglyph Complexes of the Mongolian Altai, Mongolia" to celebrate the importance of the pictograms engraved in rocks.

Some scientists in the field of neuropsychiatry and neuropsychology, such as Mario Christian Meyer, are studying the symbolic meaning of indigenous pictograms and petroglyphs, aiming to create new ways of communication between native people and modern scientists to safeguard and valorize their cultural diversity.

Modern uses 
An early modern example of the extensive use of pictographs may be seen in the map in the London suburban timetables of the London and North Eastern Railway, 1936–1947, designed by George Dow, in which a variety of pictographs was used to indicate facilities available at or near each station.  Pictographs remain in common use today, serving as pictorial, representational signs, instructions, or statistical diagrams. Because of their graphical nature and fairly realistic style, they are widely used to indicate public toilets, or places such as airports and train stations.  Because they are a concise way to communicate a concept to people who speak many different languages, pictograms have also been used extensively at the Olympics since 1964 Tokyo Summer Olympics, designed by Masaru Katsumi, and are redesigned for each set of games.

Pictographic writing as a modernist poetic technique is credited to Ezra Pound, though French surrealists credit the Pacific Northwest American Indians of Alaska who introduced writing, via totem poles, to North America.

Contemporary artist Xu Bing created Book from the Ground, a universal language made up of pictograms collected from around the world. A Book from the Ground chat program has been exhibited in museums and galleries internationally.

Pictograms are used in many areas of modern life for commodity purposes, often as a formal language (see the In mathematics section).

In mathematics

In statistics, pictograms are charts in which icons represent numbers to make it more interesting and easier to understand. A key is often included to indicate what each icon represents. All icons must be of the same size, but a fraction of an icon can be used to show the respective fraction of that amount.

For example, the following table:

can be graphed as follows:

Key:  = 10 letters

As the values are rounded to the nearest 5 letters, the second icon on Tuesday is the left half of the original.

Standardization
Pictographs can often transcend languages in that they can communicate to speakers of a number of tongues and language families equally effectively, even if the languages and cultures are completely different. This is why road signs and similar pictographic material are often applied as global standards expected to be understood by nearly all.

A standard set of pictographs was defined in the international standard ISO 7001: Public Information Symbols. Other common sets of pictographs are the laundry symbols used on clothing tags and the chemical hazard symbols as standardized by the GHS system.

Pictograms have been popularized in use on the web and in software, better known as "icons" displayed on a computer screen in order to help user navigate a computer system or mobile device.

See also 

Bouba/kiki effect
Crop art
Emoticon
Emoji
Icon (computing)
Ideasthesia
Ideogram
List of Stone Age art
List of symbols

Pecked curvilinear nucleated
Petroform
Petroglyph
Rebus
 Road sign
Rock art
Rock art of the Chumash people
Sound symbolism
Stick figure, in art
 Symbol
 Traffic sign
 Warning sign
Yakima Indian Painted Rocks

Notes

References

 Reed, Ishmael (2003). From Totems to Hip-Hop: A Multicultural Anthology of Poetry Across the Americas, 1900-2002, Ishmael Reed, ed. .

External links

Pictogram & Communication: About 1,500 practical pictograms based on Design principles of pictorial symbols for communication support(JIS T 0103:2005)
CAPL:The Culturally Authentic Pictorial Lexicon, photographic illustrations of objects for multiple languages
Pictogram Encyclopedia, The collection site of more than 500 pictograms, Pictograms are categorized, and easy to find unique pictogram
Pictopen - Modern Pictographic Writing
NounProject - Free Pictograms under open licences
Modern Pictograms - Explore word and pictogram relationships
Wolfram|Alpha - Number to pictogram translator
icons - download free icons for commercial and non commercial uses

Infographics
 
 
Rock art

Pre-Columbian art
Indigenous art
History of communication
Proto-writing
Statistical charts and diagrams